W. R. Clifford "Cliff" Wells (March 17, 1896 – August 15, 1977) was an American basketball coach and administrator. As a high school basketball coach in Indiana he led his teams to winning more than 50 tournaments, including two Indiana state championships in 1919 and 1934. He was the Tulane University head coach from 1945 to 1963. He was the first full-time executive secretary and director of the Naismith Memorial Basketball Hall of Fame, serving from 1963 to 1966. He was inducted into the Indiana Basketball Hall of Fame in 1965.  He was enshrined in the Basketball Hall of Fame as a contributor in 1972.  Wells died on August 15, 1977, of an apparent heart attack, at his home in Garland, Texas.

Head coaching record

College

References

External links
 

1896 births
1977 deaths
Basketball coaches from Indiana
High school basketball coaches in Indiana
High school basketball coaches in the United States
Naismith Memorial Basketball Hall of Fame inductees
National Collegiate Basketball Hall of Fame inductees
Sportspeople from Indianapolis
Tulane Green Wave men's basketball coaches